Justice Dana may refer to:

Francis Dana (1743–1811), chief justice of the Massachusetts Supreme Judicial Court
Howard H. Dana Jr. (born 1940), associate justice of the Maine Supreme Judicial Court